The Shot of the Week Award is an award given to the curler with the most outstanding shot at one of two events:

Scotties Tournament of Hearts Shot of the Week Award
Tim Hortons Brier Shot of the Week Award